The Kinnaur Kailasha (locally known as Kinner Kailash) is a mountain in the Kinnaur district of the Indian state of Himachal Pradesh. Kinnaur Kailash peak has a height of 6050 meters and is considered sacred by both Hindu and Buddhist Kinnauris. This mountain is sometimes confused with the Mount Kailash in Tibet.

The monolithic pillar (Shivling) is located at an altitude of around 4800 meters.

The Kinnaur Kailash Range borders the district of Kinnaur in the south and is dominated by Jorkanden (elevation- 6473m) peaks. Jorkanden is the highest peak in the Kinner-Kailash range.

References

Geography of Kinnaur district
Mountains of Himachal Pradesh
Shiva temples in India
Six-thousanders of the Himalayas